Whitby—Oshawa was a federal electoral district in Ontario, Canada, that has been represented in the House of Commons of Canada since 2004.  Following the 2012 federal electoral boundaries redistribution, the bulk of the district became part of the new Whitby district, while parts of it will be transferred to Oshawa and Durham.

History

The riding was created in 2003 and consists of 68 percent of the Whitby—Ajax district, 20 percent of the Oshawa district and three percent of the Durham district. The provincial electoral district was created from the same ridings in 2007.

The riding consisted of the Town of Whitby and northwestern section of the City of Oshawa (specifically, the portion of the city lying north and west of a line drawn from the western city limit east along King Street West, north along the Oshawa Creek, east along Rossland Road West, north along Simcoe Street North, and east along Winchester Road East to the eastern city limit).

Demographics
According to the Canada 2011 Census
 Population: 146,307
 Ethnic Groups: 81.4% White, 5.5% Black, 4.3% South Asian, 1.7% Chinese, 1.7% Filipino, 1.4% Aboriginal
 Languages: 85.3% English, 2.1% French, 1.5% Italian, 1.1% Chinese
 Religion: 71.2% Christian (32.6% Catholic, 10.3% United Church, 8.3% Anglican, 2.6% Presbyterian, 2.4% Christian Orthodox, 2.1% Baptist, 10.4% Other Christian), 2.6% Muslim, 1.4% Hindu, 23.6% No religion. 
 Average household income: $104,969
 Median household income: $89,608
 Average individual income: $48,444
 Median individual income: $37,099

Members of Parliament

This riding has elected the following Members of Parliament:

Pat Perkins was elected in a November 17, 2014 by-election following the death of Jim Flaherty who died in office on April 10, 2014.

Election results

See also
 List of Canadian federal electoral districts
 Past Canadian electoral districts

References

Notes

Sources
 Riding history from the Library of Parliament
 Whitby—Oshawa 2001 Census Information
 Campaign expense data from Elections Canada

Former federal electoral districts of Ontario
Politics of Oshawa
Whitby, Ontario